Laila Ajjawi (Arabic: ليلى عجاوي) is a graffiti artist born and raised in a Palestinian refugee camp outside of Irbid, Jordan. Her work focuses on visibility for women living in the Middle East, particularly refugees facing discrimination and limited resources in their countries of residence. She has created murals with Women on Walls a public art project based in Egypt aimed at empowering women through street art.

Women's rights are on the rise in Jordan, but not fast enough for Ajjawi. She is trying to encourage Jordanian women to take control of their lives, despite legal and social opposition.

A physicist by profession, she trains her peers, writes and deals with art. As an artist, she uses Colored- Pencils, Ink, Watercolors, Oil on canvas, and Digital art.

References

Women graffiti artists
Palestinians
Living people
Palestinian women artists
Year of birth missing (living people)
Women muralists